Keilee Joseph (born 19 January 2002) is an Australian professional rugby league footballer who plays as a  for the Sydney Roosters in the NRL Women's Premiership (NRLW). She has played for Australia at international level.

Background
Joseph was born in Brisbane, Queensland. She has Indigenous Australian heritage. She attended Marsden State High School, before earning a rugby league scholarship to Mabel Park State High School.

Joseph played junior club rugby league for the Waterford Demons in Meadowbrook, where she was coached by her father Shane Joseph. She later captained the Queensland under-19 side.

Playing career

2021 season
On 27 February 2022, in the first round of the delayed 2021 NRL Women's season, Joseph made her debut off the interchange bench for the Sydney Roosters against the Brisbane Broncos. In round three, she scored her first try for the club in a 28–12 win against the Newcastle Knights. On 10 April 2022, she played in the Sydney Roosters' grand final victory against the St George Illawara Dragons to secure the club's first NRLW premiership. Overall, during the 2021 season, Joseph scored two tries from six appearances, all coming from the interchange bench.

2022 season
Joseph appeared in all five rounds for the Sydney Roosters during 2022 season, winning the club's first NRLW minor premiership on 18 September. Joseph was named in the "Dream Team" announced by the Rugby League Players Association. The team was selected by the players, who each cast one vote for each position.

In November, at the delayed 2021 Women's Rugby League World Cup, Joseph made her debut for Australia, playing two games during the tournament as her country secured the World Cup.

References

External links
Sydney Roosters profile

2002 births
Living people
Australian female rugby league players
Sydney Roosters (NRLW) players
Indigenous Australian rugby league players
Indigenous All Stars players
Rugby league locks
Rugby league players from Brisbane
Australia women's national rugby league team players